Merryman is a surname. Notable people with the surname include:

Deanna Merryman (born 1972), American actress and model
George H. Merryman (1878–1948), American physician and politician
Jerry Merryman (1932–2019), inventor of the handheld calculator
John Merryman (1824–1881), the petitioner in one of the best known habeas corpus cases of the American Civil War
Marjorie Merryman, American composer, author, and music educator
 Merryman, a DC Comics character and leader of the Inferior Five

See also
Merriman (disambiguation)
Ex parte Merryman, 17 F. Cas. 144 (1861), well-known U.S. federal court case which arose out of the American Civil War